The Jamaican Sportsman and Sportswoman of the Year is an annual election, organised by the RJR Sports Foundation, which honours outstanding achievement(s) in sport by Jamaican athletes during the previous year.

List of winners

See also
Athlete of the Year
Laureus World Sports Award for Sportsman of the Year (Laureus World Sports Academy)
Laureus World Sports Award for Sportswoman of the Year
L'Équipe Champion of Champions Award

References

 Radio Jamaica 
 2006 election
 2008 election
 

Sport in Jamaica
National sportsperson-of-the-year trophies and awards
Awards established in 1961
1961 establishments in Jamaica